The Eurovision Young Dancers, often shortened to EYD, or Young Dancers, was a biennial dance competition, organised by the European Broadcasting Union (EBU) and is broadcast on television throughout Europe.

Performers between the ages of 16 and 21, from member countries of the European Broadcasting Union, compete as solo of couples to dance routines of their choice. Professional jury members each representing the elements of ballet, contemporary, and modern dancing, score each of the performances. The two participants which receive the most overall points advance to a televised 'dance-off' final, where the winner is decided by the jury.

On 16 December 2017, the fifteenth and most recent edition took place in Prague, Czech Republic and was won by Paulina Bidzińska of Poland, with Patricija Crnkovič of Slovenia placing second (runner-up).

History

Young Dancers takes place every two-years, in parallel to its successful counterpart, Eurovision Young Musicians (another of the EBU's biennial youth competitions). The inaugural Eurovision Young Dancers contest, then known as Eurovision Competition for Young Dancers, took place in Reggio Emilia, Italy, on 16 June 1985. Eleven countries who are members of the European Broadcasting Union (EBU) competed in the début contest.  won the first edition in 1985, represented by Arantxa Argüelles.

A total of thirty-seven countries having competed at least once since 1985.  is the only non-European country to have taken part in the contest (as well as the only country in North America to have ever participated in a Eurovision event), although their broadcaster, Canadian Broadcasting Corporation (CBC), is an associate member of the EBU. Eurovision Young Dancers is also the only Eurovision event to feature a country whose broadcaster is neither a full nor associate member of the EBU, as Kosovo made their sole appearance in 2011 (although they have broadcast other Eurovision events for many years). Bulgaria's debut and only appearance in 1991 also marked the first participation of a former Warsaw Pact country in a Eurovision event, as well as the longest gap between a country's debut at another Eurovision event prior to appearing at the Eurovision Song Contest (with fourteen years separating their Young Dancers debut and their Song Contest debut).

In the entire history of the event, only three contests (2007, 2009 and 2019) have never occurred. The 2007 Eurovision Young Dancers was cancelled to allow the Prix de Lausanne, a similar event organised by Swiss broadcaster SRG SSR idée suisse to take place at the same venue. The decision to cancel the contest was mutually agreed between the host broadcaster and the EBU. The following contest was due to be held on 19 June 2009 at the Dance House in Oslo, however was eventually cancelled due to a lack of interest from broadcasters. The contest would eventually be held again in 2011 when the format was revived as a prime time show.

On 23 January 2017 the EBU announced that Maltese broadcaster Public Broadcasting Services (PBS), who agreed to host the event in July 2015, had due to circumstances beyond their control been forced to cancel their staging of the competition. The EBU also stated they were looking for another host broadcaster but should one not be found in time the competition would not take place this year and is expected to return in 2019. On 18 May 2017, Czech broadcaster Česká televize (ČT) confirmed that they would host the contest for a second time.

On 20 December 2018, the contest was cancelled due to the absence of a broadcaster willing to host the competition. In October 2020, the EBU ruled out bringing the contest back until further notice.

Format

The format has been roughly the same since the 1985 inauguration of the competition. All competing dancers are to be non-professional and between the ages of 16–21. Participants may consist of solo or couples, with each performing a dance routine of their choice, which they have prepared in advance of the competition. All of the acts then take part in a choreographed group dance during 'Young Dancers Week'.

From 1989 to 2003, a semi-final round took place a few days before the Contest, and the jury decided as well which countries qualified for the televised final. In the 2003 contest, the professional jury voted electronically, immediately following each act, awarding points for technique and artistry. For the 2005 contest, the traditional format was changed. A week of dance master classes replaced the semi-final round. Florence Clerc, Irek Mukhamedow, Christopher Bruce and Piotr Nardelli were the dance teachers selected to work with the participants and tasked to select the 10 finalists out of the 13 participating countries.

In 1989 and 2003, the contest awarded two sets of first prize, one for classical and one for contemporary dance. An additional "Youth Jury" prize was awarded in 2003 chosen by a panel of dance enthusiasts in the audience.

The format is revamped in 2011 to include a 'final duel' round and the semi-finals are removed due to the low number of participating countries. Jury members of a professional aspect and representing the elements of ballet, contemporary, and modern dancing styles, score each of the competing individual and group dance routines. Once all the jury votes have been counted, the two participants which received the highest total of points progress to a final round. The final round consists of a 90-second 'dual', were each of the finalists perform a 45-second random dance-off routine. The overall winner upon completion of the final dances is chosen by the professional jury members.

Participation

Eligible participants include   primarily Active Members (as opposed to Associate Members) of the EBU. Active members are those who are located in states that fall within the European Broadcasting Area, or are member states of the Council of Europe.

The European Broadcasting Area is defined by the International Telecommunication Union:

The "European Broadcasting Area" is bounded on the west by the western boundary of Region 1, on the east by the meridian 40° East of Greenwich and on the south by the parallel 30° North so as to include the northern part of Saudi Arabia and that part of those countries bordering the Mediterranean within these limits. In addition, Armenia, Azerbaijan, Georgia and those parts of the territories of Iraq, Jordan, Syrian Arab Republic, Turkey and Ukraine lying outside the above limits are included in the European Broadcasting Area.

The western boundary of Region 1 is defined by a line running from the North Pole along meridian 10° West of Greenwich to its intersection with parallel 72° North; thence by great circle arc to the intersection of meridian 50° West and parallel 40° North; thence by great circle arc to the intersection of meridian 20° West and parallel 10° South; thence along meridian 20° West to the South Pole.

Active members include broadcasting organisations whose transmissions are made available to at least 98% of households in their own country which are equipped to receive such transmissions. If an EBU Active Member wishes to participate, they must fulfil conditions as laid down by the rules of the contest (of which a separate copy is drafted annually).

Eligibility to participate is not determined by geographic inclusion within the continent of Europe, despite the "Euro" in "Eurovision" – nor does it have any relation to the European Union.

Thirty-six countries have participated at least once. These are listed here alongside the year in which they made their début:

Hosting
Most of the expense of the contest is covered by commercial sponsors and contributions from the other participating nations. The contest is considered to be a unique opportunity for promoting the host country as a tourist destination. The table below shows a list of cities and venues that have hosted the Eurovision Young Dancers, one or more times. Future venues are shown in italics. With 3 contests, Poland is the country having hosted the most contests, albeit in different cities.

Winners
Sixteen performances have won the Eurovision Young Dancers competition, a biennial dance contest organised by member countries of the European Broadcasting Union. From  onwards, there have only been prizes awarded to the winner and runner-up. Below is a break-down of all those winners by each individual event and by number of wins per country.

Winners by year

Winners by country
The table below shows the top-three placings from each contest, along with the years that a country won the contest.

Presenters

See also 

 Eurovision Choir of the Year
 Eurovision Dance Contest
 Eurovision Magic Circus Show
 Eurovision Song Contest
 Eurovision Young Musicians
 Junior Eurovision Song Contest

Notes and references

Notes

References

External links 

 
 Eurovision Young Dancers – European Broadcasting Union

 
Dance competition television shows
Young Dancers
Recurring events established in 1985